John William Bradford (6 November 1903–1984) was an English footballer who played in the Football League for Brighton & Hove Albion, Preston North End and Walsall.

References

1903 births
1984 deaths
English footballers
Association football midfielders
English Football League players
Birmingham City F.C. players
Brighton & Hove Albion F.C. players
Preston North End F.C. players
Walsall F.C. players